This is a partial list of active, dormant, and extinct volcanoes in New Zealand.

Kermadec Arc and Havre Trough

North Island

Taupō Volcanic Zone

Elsewhere
Mangakino Culdera

South Island

Other

Ross Dependency
New Zealand also has de facto administration over Ross Dependency in Antarctica, which contains the following volcanoes:

References

External links

New Zealand's Volcanoes at GNS Science

 
New Zealand
Volcanoes
Volcanoes
Geography of the Kermadec Islands